María Beatriz Pagés Llergo Rebollar (born 25 February 1954) is a Mexican journalist and politician from the Institutional Revolutionary Party. From 2006 to 2009 she served as Deputy of the LX Legislature of the Mexican Congress representing the Federal District. She quit from the party, saying that it had been handed over to president López Obrador. She has been critical of the president's party and government, calling it "populist, destructive, and authoritarian". 

Pagés is the Director of the political magazine Siempre!, founded by her father, journalist José Pagés Llergo.

References

1951 births
Living people
Politicians from Guadalajara, Jalisco
Women members of the Chamber of Deputies (Mexico)
Mexican journalists
Members of the Chamber of Deputies (Mexico) for Mexico City
Institutional Revolutionary Party politicians
21st-century Mexican politicians
21st-century Mexican women politicians
Members of the Constituent Assembly of Mexico City
Deputies of the LX Legislature of Mexico